The year 2003 in film involved some significant events.

Highest-grossing films

The top 10 films released in 2003 by worldwide gross are as follows:

The Lord of the Rings: The Return of the King grossed more than $1.14  billion, making it the highest-grossing film in 2003 worldwide and in North America and the second-highest-grossing film up to that time. It was also the second film to surpass the billion-dollar milestone after Titanic in 1997.

Finding Nemo was the highest-grossing animated movie of all time until being overtaken by Shrek 2 in 2004.

Events
 February 24: The Pianist, directed by Roman Polanski, wins 7 César Awards: Best Film, Best Director, Best Actor, Best Sound, Best Production Design, Best Music and Best Cinematography.
 June 12: Gregory Peck dies of bronchopneumonia.
 June 29: Katharine Hepburn dies of cardiac arrest.
 November 17: Arnold Schwarzenegger sworn in as Governor of California.
 December 22: Both of the movies from the  Matrix trilogy released in 2003 were shut out of visual effects Oscar consideration by the Visual Effects Award Nominating Committee.
 December 31: The Academy of Motion Picture Arts and Sciences mails nomination ballots in which it qualifies 254 films released in 2003 as eligible for Oscar consideration.

Award ceremonies
 8th Empire Awards

Awards

2003 wide-release films

January–March

April–June

July–September

October–December

Notable films released in 2003
United States unless stated

#
 101 Dalmatians II: Patch's London Adventure
 11:14, starring Rachael Leigh Cook – (Canada/US)
 2 Fast 2 Furious, directed by John Singleton, starring Paul Walker, Tyrese Gibson and Eva Mendes
 2LDK – (Japan)
 21 Grams, directed by Alejandro González Iñárritu, starring Sean Penn, Naomi Watts and Benicio del Toro
 3 Deewarein (3 Walls) – (India: Hindi)
 The 4th Floor (Planta 4ª) – (Spain)
 44 Minutes: The North Hollywood Shoot-Out, starring Michael Madsen

A
 Acacia – (South Korea)
 After You... (Après vous...), starring Daniel Auteuil and José Garcia – (France)
 Agent Cody Banks, starring Frankie Muniz, Hilary Duff and Angie Harmon
 Alex and Emma, directed by Rob Reiner, starring Kate Hudson and Luke Wilson
 Alexandra's Project – (Australia)
 Alien (re-release, was originally released in 1979)
 All the Real Girls, directed by David Gordon Green, starring Zooey Deschanel
 All Tomorrow's Parties (Mingri tianya) – (China)
 Alone Across Australia – (Australia)
 The Alzheimer Case (a.k.a. The Memory of a Killer) – (Belgium)
 American Splendor, starring Paul Giamatti and Hope Davis
 American Wedding, starring Jason Biggs, Alyson Hannigan and Seann William Scott
 Ana and the Others (Ana y los otros) – (Argentina)
 Ang Tanging Ina (The Only Mother) – (Philippines)
 Anger Management, directed by Peter Segal, starring Adam Sandler, Marisa Tomei and Jack Nicholson
 Angulimala – (Thailand)
 The Animatrix – (Japan/US)
 Any Way the Wind Blows – (Belgium)
 Anything Else, directed by and starring Woody Allen, with Jason Biggs, Christina Ricci and Danny DeVito
 Après la vie (a.k.a. Three: After Life) – (France/Belgium)
 Arisan! (The Gathering) – (Indonesia)
 At Five in the Afternoon (Panj é asr) – (Iran)

B
 Baadasssss!, directed by and starring Mario Van Peebles
 Bad Boys II, directed by Michael Bay, starring Martin Lawrence, Will Smith and Gabrielle Union
 Bad Santa, directed by Terry Zwigoff, starring Billy Bob Thornton, Tony Cox, Lauren Graham and Bernie Mac
 Baghban (Gardener) – (India: Hindi)
 The Barbarian Invasions (Les invasions barbares) – (Canada) – (Cesar Award for Best Film)
 Basic, directed by John McTiernan, starring John Travolta, Samuel L. Jackson and Connie Nielsen
 The Basque Ball: Skin Against Stone (La pelota vasca: la piel contra la piedra) – (Spain)
 Beautiful Boxer (บิวตี้ฟูล บ๊อกเซอร์) – (Thailand)
 Beauty and the Beast – (South Africa/UK)
 Beneath Her Window (Pod njenim oknom) – (Slovenia)
 The Best of Youth (La Meglio gioventù) – (Italy)
 Beyond Borders, starring Angelina Jolie and Clive Owen
 Beyond Re-Animator, starring Jeffrey Combs and Santiago Segura – (Spain)
 Big Fish, directed by Tim Burton, starring Ewan McGregor, Albert Finney, Danny DeVito, Steve Buscemi and Jessica Lange
 Bimmer (Бумер) – (Russia)
 Biola Tak Berdawai (The Stringless Violin) – (Indonesia)
 Blind Shaft (Mángjǐng) – (China)
 Blizzard, starring Christopher Plummer, Brenda Blethyn and Whoopi Goldberg – (Canada/US)
 The Blue Light (Ao no Honō) – (Japan)
 Blueprint, starring Franka Potente – (Germany)
 Bon Voyage, starring Isabelle Adjani and Gérard Depardieu – (France)
 Bonjour Monsieur Shlomi (Ha-Kochavim Shel Shlomi) – (Israel)
 Boredom in Brno (Nuda v Brně) – (Czech Republic)
 Bright Future (Akarui Mirai), directed by Kiyoshi Kurosawa – (Japan)
 Bright Young Things, directed by Stephen Fry, starring Emily Mortimer, Stephen Campbell Moore, Michael Sheen, James McAvoy, Dan Aykroyd and Peter O'Toole – (UK)
 Bringing Down the House, starring Steve Martin and Queen Latifah
 Brother Bear
 The Brown Bunny, directed by and starring Vincent Gallo with Chloë Sevigny
 Bruce Almighty, starring Jim Carrey, Jennifer Aniston, Morgan Freeman and Steve Carell
 Buddy – (Norway)
 Bulletproof Monk, starring Chow Yun-fat and Seann William Scott

C
 Café Lumière (Kohi Jiko), directed by Hou Hsiao-hsien – (Japan)
 Cala, My Dog! (Kala shi tiao gou) – (China)
 Calendar Girls, starring Helen Mirren and Julie Walters – (UK)
 Carandiru, directed by Héctor Babenco – (Brazil/Argentina)
 Carolina, starring Julia Stiles
 Casa de los Babys, directed by John Sayles, starring Daryl Hannah and Marcia Gay Harden – (Mexico/US)
 The Cat in the Hat, starring Mike Myers, Dakota Fanning, Spencer Breslin, Alec Baldwin and Kelly Preston
 Caterina in the Big City (Caterina va in città) – (Italy)
 Cavale (a.k.a. One: On the Run) – (France/Belgium)
 Cell Phone (shŏujī) – (China)
 Charlie's Angels: Full Throttle, directed by McG, starring Drew Barrymore, Cameron Diaz, Lucy Liu, Demi Moore and Bernie Mac
 Cheaper by the Dozen, Directed by Shawn Levy, starring Steve Martin, Bonnie Hunt, Piper Perabo, Hilary Duff and Tom Welling
 Cheerleader Queens (ว้ายบึ้ม! เชียร์กระหึ่มโลก) – (Thailand)
 Cheese and Jam (Kajmak in marmelada) – (Slovenia)
 Chirusoku no Natsu – (Japan)
 The Classic (클래식) – (South Korea)
 Cleopatra – (Argentina)
 Cloaca – (Netherlands)
 Code 46, directed by Michael Winterbottom, starring Tim Robbins and Samantha Morton – (UK)
 Coffee and Cigarettes, directed by Jim Jarmusch, starring Bill Murray, Cate Blanchett, Tom Waits and Roberto Benigni
 Cold Creek Manor, directed by Mike Figgis, starring Dennis Quaid, Sharon Stone, Stephen Dorff, Juliette Lewis and Kristen Stewart
 Cold Mountain, directed by Anthony Minghella, starring Jude Law, Nicole Kidman and Renée Zellweger
 The Company, directed by Robert Altman, starring Neve Campbell, James Franco and Malcolm McDowell
 Confidence, starring Dustin Hoffman, Rachel Weisz, Edward Burns and Andy García
 The Cooler, starring William H. Macy, Maria Bello and Alec Baldwin
 The Core, starring Hilary Swank, Aaron Eckhart and DJ Qualls
 The Corporation – (Canada)
 Cowards Bend the Knee – (Canada)
 Cradle 2 the Grave, starring Jet Li and DMX
 Crimson Gold (Talaye Sorkh), directed by Jafar Panahi – (Iran)
 Cristina Quer Casar (Cristina Wants to Get Married) – (Brazil)
 The Cunning Little Vixen, animated version of Leoš Janáček's opera – (UK) – (film only mentioned in article)

D
 Daddy Day Care, starring Eddie Murphy, Jeff Garlin and Anjelica Huston
 Danny Deckchair, starring Rhys Ifans and Miranda Otto – (Australia)
 Daredevil, starring Ben Affleck, Jennifer Garner, Colin Farrell and Michael Clarke Duncan
 Dark Blue, directed by Ron Shelton, starring Kurt Russell
 Darkness Falls, starring Chaney Kley and Emma Caulfield
 Deliver Us from Eva, starring Gabrielle Union and LL Cool J
 Devil's Pond, starring Tara Reid
 Dickie Roberts: Former Child Star, starring David Spade
 Dil Ka Rishta ( Relationship of Heart) starring Arjun Rampal, Aishwarya Rai, Isha Koppikar, Priyanshu Chatterjee, Raakhee and Paresh Rawal – (India: Hindi)
 Distant Lights (Lichter) – (Germany)
 Le Divorce, directed by James Ivory, starring Kate Hudson, Naomi Watts, Glenn Close and Stephen Fry
 Dogville, directed by Lars von Trier, starring Nicole Kidman, Paul Bettany, Lauren Bacall, Stellan Skarsgård and Ben Gazzara – (International)
 Doppelganger – (Japan)
 Down with Love, starring Renée Zellweger, Ewan McGregor and David Hyde Pierce
 Dreamcatcher, directed by Lawrence Kasdan, starring Morgan Freeman, Thomas Jane, Jason Lee and Timothy Olyphant
 The Dreamers (Les Reveurs), directed by Bernardo Bertolucci, starring Michael Pitt, Louis Garrel and Eva Green – (France/UK/Italy)
 Drifters (Er di) – (China)
 Duplex, directed by Danny DeVito, starring Ben Stiller and Drew Barrymore
 DysFunKtional Family

E
 Eddie's Million Dollar Cook-Off
 Elephant – directed by Gus Van Sant, winner of Palme d'Or award
 Elf, directed by Jon Favreau, starring Will Ferrell, James Caan, Zooey Deschanel, Mary Steenburgen and Bob Newhart
 Eve's Dropping In
 Evil (Ondskan) – (Sweden)

F
 Facing Windows (La finestra di fronte) – (Italy) – Golden Space Needle award (for 2004)
 Fake (เฟค โกหกทั้งเพ) – (Thailand)
 Falling Angels, starring Miranda Richardson – (Canada)
 Fan Chan (My Girl) – (Thailand)
 Far Side of the Moon (La face cachée de la lune) – (Canada)
 Faster – (US/Spain)
 Father and Son (Otets i syn), directed by Alexander Sokurov – (Russia)
 Fear and Trembling (Stupeur et tremblements) – (France)
 Festival Express, featuring Janis Joplin, Grateful Dead and The Band – (Netherlands/UK)
 The Fighting Temptations, starring Cuba Gooding, Jr., Beyoncé Knowles and Mike Epps
 Final Destination 2, starring Ali Larter and A.J. Cook
 Finding Nemo, directed by Andrew Stanton, voices of Albert Brooks, Ellen DeGeneres, Geoffrey Rush and Barry Humphries  – Academy Award for Best Animated Feature
 The Five Obstructions (De fem benspænd), directed by and starring Lars von Trier – (Denmark)
 The First Night (La primera noche) – (Colombia)
 Flywheel
 Foolproof, starring Ryan Reynolds and Kristin Booth – (Canada)
 Freaky Friday, starring Lindsay Lohan and Jamie Lee Curtis
 Freddy vs. Jason, starring Robert Englund
 Free Radicals (Böse Zellen) – (Austria)
 Fuse (Gori vatra) – (Bosnia & Herzegovina)

G
 Game Over: Kasparov and the Machine, featuring Garry Kasparov – (UK/Canada)
 Games of Love and Chance (L'Esquive) – (France)
 Garden of Heaven (Haneul jeongwon) – (South Korea)
 Gettin' Square – (Australia)
 Georges Bataille's Story of the Eye, directed by Andrew Repasky McElhinney (USA)
 Gigli, directed by Martin Brest, starring Ben Affleck, Jennifer Lopez, Christopher Walken and Al Pacino – Winner of 6 Razzies
 Ginger and Cinnamon (Dillo con parole mie) – (Italy)
 Girl with a Pearl Earring, starring Scarlett Johansson and Colin Firth – (UK/Luxembourg)
 Godforsaken (Van God Los) – (Netherlands)
 Gods and Generals, starring Stephen Lang, Jeff Daniels and Robert Duvall
 Godzilla: Tokyo S.O.S. (Gojira tai Mosura tai Mekagojira Tōkyō Esu Ō Esu) – (Japan)
 Going for Broke, starring Gerald McRaney and Delta Burke
 Good Bye, Lenin!, starring Daniel Brühl – (Germany)
 A Good Lawyer's Wife (Baramnan Kajok) – (South Korea)
 Good Morning, Night (Buongiorno, notte) – (Italy)
 Goodbye, Dragon Inn (Bu San) – (Taiwan)
 The Gospel of John, starring Henry Ian Cusick – (UK/Canada/US)
 Gothika, directed by Mathieu Kassovitz, starring Halle Berry and Robert Downey, Jr.
 Gozu, directed by Takashi Miike – (Japan)
 Grand Theft Parsons, starring Johnny Knoxville and Christina Applegate
 The Greatest Expectation (Widaehan yusan) – (South Korea)
 The Green Butchers (De grønne slagtere), starring Mads Mikkelsen – (Denmark)
 Green Tea (Lu Cha), directed by Zhang Yuan – (China)
 Grind
 A Guy Thing, starring Julia Stiles, Jason Lee and Selma Blair

H
 Harvie Krumpet, starring Geoffrey Rush – (Australia)
 The Haunted Mansion, starring Eddie Murphy, Jennifer Tilly and Terence Stamp
 Haute Tension (High Tension) – (France)
 Havana Suite (Suite Habana) – (Cuba)
 Head of State, directed by and starring Chris Rock, with Bernie Mac and Nick Searcy
 The Heart of Me, starring Helena Bonham Carter, Paul Bettany and Olivia Williams – (UK)
 Helmiä ja sikoja (Pearls and Pigs) – (Finland)
 Hey DJ, starring Charlotte Lewis, Terry Camilleri, Jon Jacobs and Tina Wiseman
 Holes, starring Shia LaBeouf, Sigourney Weaver, Patricia Arquette and Jon Voight
 Hollywood Homicide, directed by Ron Shelton, starring Harrison Ford and Josh Hartnett
 Hope Springs, starring Colin Firth, Minnie Driver and Heather Graham – (UK/US)
 Horseman (Konjanik) – (Croatia)
 House of 1000 Corpses, directed by Rob Zombie, starring Sid Haig
 House of Sand and Fog, starring Jennifer Connelly and Ben Kingsley
 A House with a View of the Sea (Una casa con vista al mar) – (Venezuela)
 How to Deal, starring Mandy Moore
 How to Lose a Guy in 10 Days, starring Kate Hudson and Matthew McConaughey
 Hulk, directed by Ang Lee, starring Eric Bana, Jennifer Connelly, Nick Nolte, Sam Elliott and Josh Lucas
 The Human Stain, directed by Robert Benton, starring Anthony Hopkins and Nicole Kidman
 The Hunted, directed by William Friedkin, starring Tommy Lee Jones and Benicio del Toro

I
 I Am David, starring Jim Caviezel
 I Capture the Castle, starring Romola Garai – (UK)
 I'm Not Scared (Io non ho paura) – (Italy)
 Identity, directed by James Mangold, starring John Cusack, Ray Liotta and Amanda Peet
 If You Were Me (Yeoseot gae ui siseon) – (South Korea)
 Imagining Argentina, starring Antonio Banderas and Emma Thompson – (Spain/UK/US)
 In the City (En la ciudad) – (Spain)
 In the Cut, directed by Jane Campion, starring Meg Ryan and Mark Ruffalo
 The In-Laws (remake), starring Michael Douglas and Albert Brooks
 Incantato (a.k.a. The Heart is Elsewhere) – (Italy)
 Infernal Affairs II (Mou gaan dou II) – (Hong Kong)
 Infernal Affairs III (Mou gaan dou III: Jung gik mou gaan), starring Andy Lau and Tony Leung Chiu-Wai – (Hong Kong)
 ...ing – (South Korea)
 The Inheritance (Arven) – (Denmark)
 Intermission, starring Cillian Murphy, Colin Farrell and Kelly Macdonald – (Ireland)
 Interview, directed by Theo van Gogh – (Netherlands)
 Into the Mirror (Geoul sokeuro) – (South Korea)
 Intolerable Cruelty, directed by Joel and Ethan Coen, starring George Clooney, Catherine Zeta-Jones, Geoffrey Rush and Billy Bob Thornton
 Inuyasha the Movie: Swords of an Honorable Ruler (Eiga Inuyasha: Tenka Hadō no Ken) – (Japan)
 The Invisible Children of Love – (India: Bengali)
 Les Invasions barbares (Barbarian Invasions) – (Canada/France) – Academy Award for Best Foreign Language Film
 It Runs in the Family, starring Kirk Douglas and Michael Douglas
 The Italian Job, starring Mark Wahlberg, Charlize Theron, Edward Norton and Jason Statham

J
 Jade Goddess of Mercy (Yu Guan Yin) – (China)
 Jajantaram Mamantaram
 James' Journey to Jerusalem (Massa'ot James Be'eretz Hakodesh) – (Israel)
 Japanese Story, starring Toni Collette – (Australia)
 Jeepers Creepers 2
 Johnny English, starring Rowan Atkinson and John Malkovich – (UK/US)
 The Jungle Book 2, voices of Haley Joel Osment and John Goodman
 Ju-on: The Grudge – (Japan)
 Just Married, starring Ashton Kutcher and Brittany Murphy

K
 Kaena: The Prophecy (Kaena: La prophétie), starring Kirsten Dunst and Richard Harris – (Canada/France)
 Kal Ho Naa Ho (Tomorrow Might Never Come) – (India: Hindi)
 Kangaroo Jack, starring Jerry O'Connell, Anthony Anderson, Estella Warren and Christopher Walken – (US/Australia)
 Kart Racer – (Canada)
 Kill Bill: Volume 1, directed by Quentin Tarantino, starring Uma Thurman, Lucy Liu, Sonny Chiba and Vivica A. Fox
 Killing Words (Palabras encadenadas) – (Spain)
 Kitchen Stories (Salmer fra Kjøkkenet) – (Sweden/Norway)
 The Kite (Tayyara men wara) – (Lebanon)
 Koi... Mil Gaya (I Found Someone) – (India: Hindi)
 Kontroll (Control) – (Hungary)
 Kopps (Cops) – (Sweden)

L
 Lara Croft Tomb Raider: The Cradle of Life, directed by Jan de Bont, starring Angelina Jolie and Gerard Butler – (US/UK/Japan/Germany)
 Last Life in the Universe (Ruang rak noi nid mahasan) – (Thailand)
 The Last Samurai, directed by Edward Zwick, starring Tom Cruise and Ken Watanabe
 The Last Supper (Choihui mancheon) – (South Korea)
 The League of Extraordinary Gentlemen, starring Sean Connery – (UK/US)
 Legally Blonde 2: Red, White & Blonde, starring Reese Witherspoon, Luke Wilson and Sally Field
 The Life of David Gale, directed by Alan Parker, starring Kevin Spacey, Kate Winslet, and Laura Linney
 The Lizzie McGuire Movie, starring Hilary Duff
 Looney Tunes: Back in Action, directed by Joe Dante, starring Brendan Fraser, Jenna Elfman, Steve Martin and Heather Locklear
 The Lord of the Rings: The Return of the King, directed by Peter Jackson, starring Elijah Wood, Ian McKellen and Viggo Mortensen – (New Zealand/US) – Oscar, Golden Globe and BAFTA Awards for Best Picture
 Lost in Translation, directed by Sofia Coppola, starring Bill Murray and Scarlett Johansson – (US/Japan) – Golden Globe for Best Picture (Musical or Comedy)
 Love Actually, directed by Richard Curtis, starring Colin Firth, Hugh Grant, Liam Neeson, Laura Linney, Alan Rickman and Emma Thompson – (UK)
 Love Me If You Dare (Jeux d'enfants) – (France/Belgium)
 Luther, starring Joseph Fiennes – (Germany/US)

M
 Magnifico – (Philippines)
 Malibu's Most Wanted, starring Jamie Kennedy and Taye Diggs
 Mamay – (Ukraine)
 A Man Apart, starring Vin Diesel and Larenz Tate
 The Man of the Year (O Homen do Ano) – (Brazil)
 The Man Who Copied (O Homem que Copiava) – (Brazil)
 Manhood
 Marci X, starring Lisa Kudrow and Damon Wayans
 Masked and Anonymous, starring Bob Dylan, Jeff Bridges, Penélope Cruz, Luke Wilson, Jessica Lange and John Goodman
 Master and Commander: The Far Side of the World, directed by Peter Weir, starring Russell Crowe and Paul Bettany
 Matchstick Men, directed by Ridley Scott, starring Nicolas Cage, Sam Rockwell and Alison Lohman
 The Matrix Reloaded, directed by The Wachowskis, starring Keanu Reeves, Laurence Fishburne, Carrie-Anne Moss and Hugo Weaving
 The Matrix Revolutions, directed by The Wachowskis, starring Keanu Reeves, Laurence Fishburne, Carrie-Anne Moss and Hugo Weaving
 The Medallion, starring Jackie Chan, Lee Evans and Claire Forlani – (Hong Kong/US)
 Memories of Murder (Salinui chueok) – (South Korea)
 A Mighty Wind, directed by and starring Christopher Guest with Bob Balaban, Eugene Levy, Jane Lynch, Michael McKean, Catherine O'Hara and Harry Shearer
 The Missing, directed by Ron Howard, starring Tommy Lee Jones and Cate Blanchett
 Mona Lisa Smile, directed by Mike Newell, starring Julia Roberts, Julia Stiles, Maggie Gyllenhaal and Kirsten Dunst
 Monsieur Ibrahim (a.k.a. Monsieur Ibrahim et les fleurs du Coran), starring Omar Sharif – (France)
 Monsieur N. – (France/UK)
 Monster, starring Charlize Theron (winner Oscar and Golden Globe for best actress) and Christina Ricci
 Monster Man
 Most (a.k.a. The Bridge) – (Czech Republic)
 The Mother, starring Anne Reid and Daniel Craig – (UK)
 Mother Teresa of Calcutta, starring Olivia Hussey
 Mr. Butterfly (Nabi) – (South Korea)
 Munna Bhai M.B.B.S., starring Sanjay Dutt – (India: Hindi)
 Mutt Boy (Ddong Gae) – (South Korea)
 My Boss's Daughter, starring Ashton Kutcher, Tara Reid and Terence Stamp
 My Father and I (Wo he Baba) – (China)
 My Life Without Me, starring Sarah Polley – (Spain/Canada)
 Mystic River, directed by Clint Eastwood, starring Sean Penn, Tim Robbins, Laurence Fishburne and Kevin Bacon – winner of 2 Oscars and 2 Golden Globes

N
 Narradores de Javé (The Storytellers) – (Brazil)
 Nathalie..., starring Fanny Ardant, Emmanuelle Béart and Gérard Depardieu – (France)
 National Security, starring Martin Lawrence and Steve Zahn
 Natural City (내츄럴 시티) – (South Korea)
 Ned – (Australia)
 Ned Kelly, starring Heath Ledger, Orlando Bloom and Naomi Watts – (Australia)
 Nemesis Game – (New Zealand/Canada)
 Nicotina (Nicotine) – (Mexico)
 Nina's Tragedies (Ha-Asonot Shel Nina) – (Israel)
 Noi the Albino (Nói albinói) – (Iceland)
 Nousukausi (Upswing) – (Finland)
 Nuan – (China)

O
 OK Baytong – (Thailand)
 Okkadu, directed by Gunasekhar – (India: Telugu)
 Oldboy (올드보이), directed by Park Chan-wook, starring Choi Min-sik – (South Korea) – winner of 2004 Grand Prix
 Old School, directed by Todd Phillips, starring Will Ferrell, Luke Wilson and Vince Vaughn
 The Olive Harvest – (Palestine)
 Once Upon a Time in Mexico, directed by Robert Rodriguez, starring Antonio Banderas, Salma Hayek, Willem Dafoe and Johnny Depp
 Ong-Bak: Muay Thai Warrior, starring Tony Jaa – (Thailand)
 Open Range, directed by and starring Kevin Costner, with Robert Duvall, Michael Gambon and Annette Bening
 Open Water
 The Order, starring Heath Ledger – (Germany/US)
 Osama (أسامة) – (Afghanistan) – Golden Globe Award for Best Foreign Language Film
 Osuofia in London – (Nigeria)
 Out of Time, starring Denzel Washington and Eva Mendes
 Owning Mahowny, starring Philip Seymour Hoffman, John Hurt and Minnie Driver – (Canada/UK)

P–Q
 PTU (a.k.a. PTU: Police Tactical Unit) – (Hong Kong)
 Paloh – (Malaysia)
 Paycheck, directed by John Woo, starring Ben Affleck, Uma Thurman and Aaron Eckhart
 Party Monster, starring Macaulay Culkin and Seth Green
 Peter Pan, directed by P. J. Hogan, starring Jeremy Sumpter, Rachel Hurd-Wood and Jason Isaacs – (Australia/UK/US)
 Pieces of April, starring Katie Holmes, Patricia Clarkson and Oliver Platt
 Piglet's Big Movie
 Pinjar – (India: Hindi)
 Pirates of the Caribbean: The Curse of the Black Pearl, starring Johnny Depp, Geoffrey Rush, Orlando Bloom and Keira Knightley
 Pokémon Heroes – (Japan)
 Politiki Kouzina (A Touch of Spice) – (Greece/Turkey)
 Prey for Rock & Roll, starring Gina Gershon
 The Professional (Profesionalac) – (Serbia)

R
 Radio, starring Cuba Gooding, Jr. and Ed Harris
 The Rage in Placid Lake – (Australia)
 Rahtree: Flower of the Night (Buppah Rahtree) – (Thailand)
 The Reckoning, starring Willem Dafoe and Paul Bettany – (UK/Spain)
 Reconstruction – (Denmark)
 The Recruit, starring Al Pacino and Colin Farrell
 The Rescuers Down Under (re-release) United States
 Remake, starring François Berléand and Évelyne Bouix – (Bosnia & Herzegovina/France/Turkey)
 Remember Me, My Love (Ricordati di me) – (Italy)
 The Return (Vozvrashchenie) – (Russia)
 Revengers Tragedy, directed by Alex Cox, starring Christopher Eccleston and Eddie Izzard – (UK)
 Reversal of Fortune (Yeokjeone sanda) – (South Korea)
 The Room, starring and directed by Tommy Wiseau
 Rugrats Go Wild
 Runaway Jury, starring John Cusack, Gene Hackman, Dustin Hoffman and Rachel Weisz
 The Rundown, directed by Peter Berg, starring The Rock, Seann William Scott, Rosario Dawson and Christopher Walken
 Running on Karma (Daai zek lou), starring Andy Lau – (Hong Kong)

S
 S-21: The Khmer Rouge Killing Machine – (Cambodia/France)
 S.W.A.T., starring Samuel L. Jackson, LL Cool J and Colin Farrell
 The Saddest Music in the World, starring Isabella Rossellini – (Canada)
 Save the Green Planet! (Jigureul Jikyeora!) – (South Korea)
 Scary Movie 3, starring Anna Faris, Charlie Sheen and  Pamela Anderson
 Scent of Love (Gukhwaggot hyanggi) – (South Korea)
 School of Rock, directed by Richard Linklater, starring Jack Black, Joan Cusack, Mike White and  Sarah Silverman
 Schultze Gets the Blues – (Germany)
 Seabiscuit, directed by Gary Ross, starring Tobey Maguire, Jeff Bridges, William H. Macy and Chris Cooper
 Secondhand Lions, starring Haley Joel Osment, Robert Duvall and Michael Caine
 Seducing Doctor Lewis (La grande séduction) – (Canada)
 Sexo con Amor (Sex with Love) – (Chile)
 Shanghai Knights, starring Jackie Chan and Owen Wilson
 Shara (Sharasōju) – (Japan)
 Shattered Glass, starring Hayden Christensen, Chloë Sevigny, Peter Sarsgaard and Hank Azaria
 Shelter Dogs
 Silmido – (South Korea)
 Simhadri (సింహాద్రి), directed by S. S. Rajamouli (India: Telugu)
 Sinbad: Legend of the Seven Seas
 The Singing Detective, starring Robert Downey, Jr., Katie Holmes and Mel Gibson
 Singles – (South Korea)
 Slim Susie (Smala Sussie) – (Sweden)
 The Snow Walker – (Canada)
 Soldados de Salamina (The Soldiers of Salamis) – (Spain)
 Something's Gotta Give, directed by Nancy Meyers, starring Jack Nicholson, Diane Keaton, Keanu Reeves and Amanda Peet
 Song for a Raggy Boy, starring Aidan Quinn – (Ireland)
 The Southern Cross (La cruz del sur) – (Argentina)
 Spring, Summer, Fall, Winter... and Spring (Bom yeoreum gaeul gyeoul geurigo bom) – (South Korea)
 Spy Kids 3-D: Game Over, directed by Robert Rodriguez, starring Alexa Vega, Daryl Sabara, Antonio Banderas and Sylvester Stallone – (redirects to Spy Kids)
 The Station Agent, directed Tom McCarthy, starring Peter Dinklage, Patricia Clarkson and Bobby Cannavale
 The Statement, directed by Norman Jewison, starring Michael Caine and Tilda Swinton – (Canada/UK/France)
 The Story of Marie and Julien (Histoire de Marie et Julien), directed by Jacques Rivette, starring Emmanuelle Béart – (France)
 The Story of the Weeping Camel – (Mongolia/Germany)
 Stuck on You, directed by the Farrelly Brothers, starring Matt Damon and Greg Kinnear
 Summer in the Golden Valley (Ljeto u zlatnoj dolini) – (Bosnia & Herzegovina/France/UK)
 Svidd neger (Burned Negro) – (Norway)
 Swimming Pool, starring Charlotte Rampling – (France/UK)
 Swimming Upstream – (Australia)
 Sylvia, starring Gwyneth Paltrow and Daniel Craig – (UK/US)

T
 Tagore (ఠాగూర్), directed by V. V. Vinayak (India: Telugu)
 Tais-toi ! (Shut Up!), starring Gérard Depardieu and Jean Reno – (France)
 Take My Eyes (Te doy mis ojos) – (Spain)
 A Tale of Two Sisters (Janghwa, Hongryeon) – (South Korea)
 A Talking Picture (Um Filme Falado), directed by Manoel de Oliveira, starring Catherine Deneuve, John Malkovich and  Irene Papas – (Portugal)
 Tears of the Sun, directed by Antoine Fuqua, starring Bruce Willis and Monica Bellucci
 Teesh and Trude – (Australia)
 Terminator 3: Rise of the Machines, starring Arnold Schwarzenegger, Claire Danes, Nick Stahl and Kristanna Loken
 The Tesseract, directed by Oxide Pang, starring Jonathan Rhys Meyers – (Thailand/Japan/UK)
 Testosterone, starring Antonio Sabàto, Jr. – (US/Argentina)
 The Texas Chainsaw Massacre, starring Jessica Biel
 That Day (Ce jour-là), directed by Raúl Ruiz – (France)
 Thirteen, directed by Catherine Hardwicke, starring Evan Rachel Wood , Holly Hunter and Nikki Reed
 This Girl's Life
 A Thousand Clouds of Peace (Mil nubes de paz cercan el cielo) – (Mexico)
 A Thousand Months (Mille Mois) – (Morocco/France)
 Tie Xi Qu: West of the Tracks (Tiexi Qu) – (China)
 Till There Was You – (Philippines)
 Timeline, directed by Richard Donner, starring Frances O'Connor, Paul Walker, Gerard Butler and Billy Connolly
 Tiresia – (France)
 Today and Tomorrow (Hoy y mañana) – (Argentina)
 Tokyo Godfathers (東京ゴッドファーザーズ) – (Japan)
 Torremolinos 73 – (Spain)
 Touching the Void, directed by Kevin Macdonald – (UK)
 To Kill a King, starring Tim Roth, Dougray Scott, Olivia Williams and Rupert Everett – (UK)
 Travellers and Magicians (ཆང་ཧུབ་ཐེངས་གཅིག་གི་འཁྲུལ་སྣང) – (Bhutan)
 The Triplets of Belleville (Les Triplettes de Belleville) – (France/Belgium/Canada)
 Tupac: Resurrection
 Turn Left, Turn Right (Xiang zuo zou, xiang you zou) – (Hong Kong/Singapore)
 Twist, starring Nick Stahl – (Canada)
 Two Days, starring Paul Rudd

U
 Ultraman Cosmos vs. Ultraman Justice: The Final Battle (ウルトラマンコスモスVSウルトラマンジャスティス) – (Japan)
 Uncle Nino, starring Joe Mantegna
 Under the Tuscan Sun, starring Diane Lane – (US/Italy)
 Underworld, starring Kate Beckinsale and Scott Speedman – (UK/US/Germany/Hungary)
 Untold Scandal (Joseon namnyeo sangyeoljisa) – (South Korea)
 Uptown Girls, starring Brittany Murphy, Dakota Fanning and Heather Locklear
 Utterly Alone (Vienui Vieni) – (Lithuania)

V
 V-Day: Until the Violence Stops
 Veronica Guerin, directed by Joel Schumacher, starring Cate Blanchett – (Ireland/UK/US)
 Vida de Menina – (Brazil)
 View from the Top, starring Gwyneth Paltrow, Christina Applegate, Mark Ruffalo and Mike Myers
 Vodka Lemon – (Armenia)
 Vozvrashcheniye (The Return) – (Russia) – Golden Lion award

W
 What a Girl Wants, starring Amanda Bynes, Colin Firth and Kelly Preston
 When the Last Sword is Drawn (Mibu Gishi Den) – (Japan)
 The Whore and the Whale (La puta y la ballena) – (Argentina)
 Willard
 Witnesses (Svjedoci) – (Croatia)
 Wonderful Days (원더풀 데이즈), – (South Korea)
 Wonderland, starring Val Kilmer, Carrie Fisher, Lisa Kudrow, Christina Applegate and Janeane Garofalo
 Wondrous Oblivion, starring Delroy Lindo – (UK)
 Wrong Turn, starring Eliza Dushku and Desmond Harrington

X-Z
 X2 (X2: X-Men United) – directed by Bryan Singer, starring Hugh Jackman, Patrick Stewart, Halle Berry, Ian McKellen and Anna Paquin
 The Yes Men
 Young Adam, directed by David Mackenzie, starring Ewan McGregor, Tilda Swinton, Peter Mullan and Emily Mortimer – (UK)
 The Young Black Stallion starring Richard Romanus
 Zatōichi (The Blind Swordsman), directed by and starring Takeshi Kitano – (Japan)
 Želary – (Czech Republic/Slovakia)
 Zhou Yu's Train (zhōu yú de huǒchē), starring Gong Li and Tony Leung – (China)

Births
 January 3 - Cyrus Arnold, American actor
 January 4 - Jaeden Martell, American actor
 February 4 - Edvin Ryding, Swedish actor 
 February 20
Olivia Rodrigo, American actress and singer
William Gao, English actor and singer
 March 1 - Yasmeen Fletcher, American actress and musician
 March 6 - Millicent Simmonds, American actress
 March 12 - Malina Weissman, American actress
 March 20 - Cooper Hoffman, American actor
 April 3 – Elsie Fisher, American actress
 April 9 - Lilia Buckingham, American actress, author and dancer
 April 13 - Jean Paulo Campos, Brazilian actor
 April 30 - Emily Carey, English actress and model
 May 1 - Lizzy Greene, American actress
 June 1
Emjay Anthony, American actor
Shailyn Pierre-Dixon, Canadian actress
 June 3 - Louis Partridge, English actor
 June 29 - Alexys Nycole Sanchez, American actress
 July 1 - Storm Reid, American actress
 August 18 – Max Charles, American actor
 August 28 - Quvenzhané Wallis, American actress
 August 30 - Yasmin Finney, English actress
 September 3 - Jack Dylan Grazer, American actor
 September 18 - Aidan Gallagher, American actor and musician
 September 24 - Joe Locke, Manx actor
 September 30 - Bella Ramsey, English actress
 November 7
Lara McDonnell, Irish actress
Park Ji-hu, South Korean actress

Deaths

Film debuts 
 Jonathan Bennett – Season of Youth
 P.J. Byrne – Bruce Almighty
 Rob Corddry – Old School
 Benedict Cumberbatch – To Kill a King
 Zac Efron – Melinda's World
 Matthew Goode – Al sur de Granada
 Josh Hutcherson – American Splendor
 Leslie Jones – National Security
 Zoe Kazan – Swordswallowers and Thin Men
 Anna Kendrick – Camp
 Danny McBride – All the Real Girls
 Chris O'Dowd – Conspiracy of Silence
 Chris Pratt – The Extreme Team
 Nikki Reed – Thirteen
 Rob Riggle – Pushing Tom
 Britt Robertson – The Ghost Club
 Mike Vogel – Grind
 Kristen Wiig – Melvin Goes to Dinner

References

 
Film by year